Azorhizobium doebereinerae is a species of bacteria in the family Xanthobacteraceae. Strains of this species were originally isolated from root nodules of the shrub Sesbania virgata in Brazil. They have also been found in other Sesbania species.

References

External links
Type strain of Azorhizobium doebereinerae at BacDive -  the Bacterial Diversity Metadatabase

Hyphomicrobiales
Bacteria described in 2006